Mirko Grabovac (born 19 September 1971) is a Croatian former professional football player and coach. He had changed his nationality to Singaporean in 2001 in order to play for the Singapore national football team before renouncing it in 2008.

Playing career

Club
Grabovac was the top scorer in Singapore's S.League in 1999, 2000, 2001 and 2002 while playing for the Singapore Armed Forces FC (SAFFC), and again in 2005 playing for Tampines Rovers. He was named the S.League's Player of the Year in 2000.

With SAFFC, he scored a total of 150 S.League goals in five seasons along with seven goals in Asian competitions.

In 2007, he scored his 240th S.League goals in the Singapore Cup semi-final against Bangkok University to overtake Egmar Goncalves as the all-time S.League top goalscorer.

A year later, Grabovac was hired by Sengkang Punggol to play as a striker as well as double up as the assistant coach under head coach Saswadimata Dasuki. However, he was unable to pass the mandatory beep test twice, and served as caretaker coach for the Dolphins for a short period, starting with a 1–0 win over Gombak United which was Sengkang's second victory of the season.

Grabovac stepped down two months later as Swandi Ahmad was put in charge of the squad. He decided to leave Singapore on 5 October 2008 to rejoin his family in his native Croatia, renouncing his citizenship as well.

Managerial career
Grabovac started coaching in his native Croatia in 2009, taking charge of NK Mosor, replacing Davor Mladina. He then joined NK Imotski in the same year, and coached them for 3 years. He then returned to Mosor and coached them for a further 4 years. He was named manager of NK Omiš in June 2015 and was sacked in October 2016.

He succeeded Dragutin Ćelić at Junak Sinj in March 2017, but was dismissed as manager of Junak in January 2018 and also in early 2018, Grabovac was announced as the new head coach of his former club Warriors, this would mark his return to his former adopted nation in a footballing capacity since he renounced his Singaporean citizenship. The appointment was met with disapproval by Singaporean footballing fans and communities because of his citizenship affair stated above. He received his permit to coach Warriors from the authorities in March 2018. His time with Warriors were a disappointing one, finishing in fifth position out of nine in the 2019 Singapore Premier League. His contract were not renewed beyond that season.

Honours

Club

Singapore Armed Forces
S.League: 2000, 2002
Singapore Cup: 1999

Tampines Rovers
S.League: 2004, 2005
Singapore Cup: 2004, 2006
ASEAN Club Championship: 2005

Individual
S.League Top Scorer Award: 1999, 2000, 2001, 2002, 2005
S.League Player of the Year: 2000
S.League Player of Decade
244 S.League Goals

References

External links
 
 Mirko Grabovac at SLeague.com

1971 births
Living people
Footballers from Split, Croatia
Croatian emigrants to Singapore
People who lost Singaporean citizenship
Association football forwards
Croatian footballers
Singaporean footballers
Singapore international footballers
NK Primorac 1929 players
HNK Cibalia players
NK Zadar players
Warriors FC players
Tampines Rovers FC players
Hougang United FC players
Croatian Football League players
First Football League (Croatia) players
Second Football League (Croatia) players
Singapore Premier League players
Croatian expatriate footballers
Expatriate footballers in Singapore
Croatian expatriate sportspeople in Singapore
Croatian football managers
NK Mosor managers
NK Imotski managers
Warriors FC head coaches
Croatian expatriate football managers
Expatriate football managers in Singapore